Tipiqucha (Quechua, Hispanicized Tipiccocha, Tipicocha, Tipicucha) may refer to:

 Tipiqucha (Apurímac), a lake in the Apurímac Region, Peru
 Tipiqucha (Ayacucho), a lake in the Ayacucho Region, Peru
 Tipiqucha (Huancavelica), a lake in the Huancavelica Region, Peru
 Tipiqucha (Junín), a lake at a small place of that name in the Junín Region, Peru